Four-digit postal codes were first introduced in Romania in 1974. Beginning with 1 May 2003, postal codes have six digits, and represent addresses to the street level in major cities (those with population over 50,000). The digits represent (from left to right) the postal area; the county; the city/commune; the last three, depending on the size of the city/commune, represent the commune/city, the street, or the house/building.

The first digit represents the postal region, and the second the county in the postal region. Together, the first two digits identify a county.

The rest of the digits follow this convention:
 0xxx to 4xxx for larger cities, including the sectors of Bucharest (a postal code identifies a street address or small group of addresses)
 5xxx to 6xxx for smaller cities (a single postal code, ending in '00', is allocated to an entire city)
 7xxx for villages. A postal code is allocated to each village. A village that is the head of a commune has a postal code ending in 0 or 5.

List of codes
 01xxxx - Bucharest Sector 1
 02xxxx - Bucharest Sector 2
 03xxxx - Bucharest Sector 3
 04xxxx - Bucharest Sector 4
 05xxxx - Bucharest Sector 5
 06xxxx - Bucharest Sector 6
 07xxxx - Ilfov County
 08xxxx - Giurgiu County
 10xxxx - Prahova County
 11xxxx - Argeș County
 12xxxx - Buzău County
 13xxxx - Dâmbovița County
 14xxxx - Teleorman County
 20xxxx - Dolj County
 21xxxx - Gorj County
 22xxxx - Mehedinți County
 23xxxx - Olt County
 24xxxx - Vâlcea County
 30xxxx - Timiș County
 31xxxx - Arad County
 32xxxx - Caraș-Severin County
 33xxxx - Hunedoara County
 40xxxx - Cluj County
 41xxxx - Bihor County
 42xxxx - Bistrița-Năsăud County
 43xxxx - Maramureș County
 44xxxx - Satu Mare County
 45xxxx - Sălaj County
 50xxxx - Brașov County
 51xxxx - Alba County
 52xxxx - Covasna County
 53xxxx - Harghita County
 54xxxx - Mureș County
 55xxxx - Sibiu County
 60xxxx - Bacău County
 61xxxx - Neamț County
 62xxxx - Vrancea County
 70xxxx - Iași County
 71xxxx - Botoșani County
 72xxxx - Suceava County
 73xxxx - Vaslui County
 80xxxx - Galați County
 81xxxx - Brăila County
 82xxxx - Tulcea County
 90xxxx - Constanța County
 91xxxx - Călărași County
 92xxxx - Ialomița County

External links
 Romanian Postal Codes Romanian postal code directory (English)
 Romanian Post Company official site (you can find the postal codes there)  (This site in Romanian language)

Romania
Postal codes
1974 introductions